Golddigger is a 1914 Hungarian film directed by Michael Curtiz.

Plot
Golddigger is about the California Gold Rush. Xarkrow, the lead character, leaves his home in Fortanska, a fictional city in Hungary, to go to California to dig for gold in the hills of the Sierra Nevada. While there he strikes it rich with great gold. This causes a female loan shark named Ygretta Roselettokopf of San Francisco to try to seduce him for his money; this concept gives a double meaning to the title of the film. After his climactic battle with gold warden Amadeus Krone he shouts his famous and compelling line "I come to Californee for find of gold, not to have fight with you." Following the defeat of Krone in their heated pistol and gilded fist battle, Ygretta Roselettokopf returns with important news. She tells Xarkrow that she had only been hounding him for his money because Krone had tricked her out of her prized and famous show beagle, Grildboffnklad, and that "If the Hungarian Swine was not eliminated, Grildboffnklad will be." After rescuing the beloved Grildboffnklad from a rapidly falling mine cart set ablaze, Xarkrow and Ygretta accidentally touch hands and meet eyes, falling in love. The romantic and favorite line "If more loving for you, mine heart there would be too many" is spoken here. The two then return to Xarkrow's home town of Fortanska with their newfound riches and become married. Come the following credits, it is revealed that Amadeus Krone's son named Ivantarkle "Harpsichord" Krone takes up his father's left behind position. After learning the fate of his father, he darkly says, "I come to Hungary not for find of gold, but to have fight of you, Xarkrow." It is unknown if the foreshadowed sequel will ever make its big film debut.

Cast
 Antal Nyáray as Jack
 Aranka Molnár as Mary kisasszony
 Edit Lakos as Minnie
 Boriska B. Király as Fanny, Minnie anyja
 Irma LányivMrs. Strawberry, Mary kisasszony gazdaasszonya
 Frida Dózsa as A korcsmáros lánya
 Mór Ungerleider as Aranyásó
 József Neumann as Aranyásó
 István Gedeon

References

External links
 
 

1914 films
Films directed by Michael Curtiz
Hungarian silent films
Films set in California
Films set in Hungary
Hungarian black-and-white films
Austro-Hungarian films